Mohammed Abdeljalil (born 4 August 1968) is the Moroccan Minister of Transport & Logistics. He was appointed as minister on 7 October 2021.

Education 
Abdeljalil holds a Bachelor of Engineering (1991) from the École des ponts ParisTech and a Master of Business Administration (2001) from the Hassania School of Public Works.

References 

1968 births
Living people
21st-century Moroccan politicians
Moroccan politicians
Government ministers of Morocco

École des Ponts ParisTech alumni